The Mixed synchronized 10 metre platform competition at the 2022 World Aquatics Championships was held on 1 July 2022.

Results
The final was started at 19:00.

References

Mixed synchronized 10 metre platform